Fossalto is a comune (municipality) in the Province of Campobasso in the Italian region Molise, located about  northwest of Campobasso.

Fossalto borders the following municipalities: Castropignano, Limosano, Pietracupa, Salcito, Sant'Angelo Limosano, Torella del Sannio.

References

Cities and towns in Molise